Green fields is a suburb in Ooty town in the Tamil Nadu state of India. It constitutes ward no. 9 of the Ooty constituency of Tamil Nadu.

Establishments

Hotels
 Hotel Sri Velmurugan
 Hotel Greens
Seethalakshmi Lodge

Schools
 St. Philomena's Primary School
 Sri Venkateshwara Vidyalaya

See also
 Government Rose Garden, Ooty
 Government Botanical Gardens, Udagamandalam
 Ooty Lake
 Ooty Golf Course
 Stone House, Ooty
 Ooty Radio Telescope
 Mariamman temple, Ooty
 St. Stephen's Church, Ooty
 Kamaraj Sagar Dam

References

External links
 Ooty / Udhagai / Udhagamandalam / Oootacamund Official history and tourism page on www.nilgiris.tn.gov.in. (This site is maintained by the District Administration of the Nilgiris)

Geography of Ooty